The Department of Geography at the University of Washington is a key site for the contemporary development of critical geography and was a significant location for the quantitative revolution. The department is located in Seattle, Washington and has been highly ranked among leading geography graduate programs in the United States.

History
Coursework in geography have been offered at the University of Washington at least since the 1890s, although no department was formally established. Early courses included political geography and physical geography.

When the university was reorganized at its new location between Lake Union and Lake Washington in 1895, geography coursework was offered through the Department of Geology and Mineralogy in Denny Hall. Science Hall (now Parrington Hall) would become the new home for the department in 1902. Direction for new geographic coursework came under Henry Landes, who was head of the department, and had studied with William Morris Davis at Harvard University.

George T. Renner (Columbia) was hired in 1927 as the first geographer, and expanded the course offerings, which were dominated by physical geography. New courses included economic geography and human geography. In 1928, the department's title was renamed Department of Geology and Geography. Since 1928, there have been twelve heads (or chairs) of the department (Geography would become its own department in 1935):

 Henry Landes, 1895–1935
 Howard Martin, 1935–50
 Donald Hudson, 1950–63
 John Sherman, 1963–73
 Richard Morrill, 1973–83
 Morgan Thomas, 1983–90
 William Beyers, 1990–95, 2005–08
 David Hodge, 1995–97
 Victoria Lawson, 1997–2000
 J.W. Harrington, 2000–05
 Katharyne Mitchell, 2008–13
 Lucy A. Jarosz, 2013–18
 Sarah Elwood, 2018–present

In 1942, the Department of Geography moved into its present location, Smith Hall on the Quad. Since the start of their graduate program in 1928, the department has granted over 500 M.A. degrees and over 300 Ph.D. degrees.

Current research

Research in the department is organized in the following research themes:
Access
Area Studies
The City
Development
GIS
Mobility
Nature-Society
Population
Public Participation
Racialization and Space
Social Justice
Sustainability

Alumni and Faculty

The department has several notable alumni, including:

Brian Berry
William Bunge
Waldo Tobler

Notable faculty of the department include:

Edward Ullman
William Garrison

References

External links
 

Geography
Geography education in the United States